This is a list of number-one albums of 2020 in Poland, per the OLiS chart.

Chart history

See also
 List of number-one singles of 2020 (Poland)

References

Number-one albums
Poland
2020